First on the Moon (Pervye na Lune) is a 2005 Russian mockumentary science fiction film about a fictional 1930s Soviet landing on the Moon. The film, which went on to win many awards, was the debut of the director Aleksei Fedorchenko.

Plot
A group of journalists are investigating a highly secret document when they uncover a sensational story: that before the Second World War, in 1938, the first rocket was made in the USSR and Soviet scientists were planning to send an orbiter to the Moon and back.  The evidence is convincing; it is clear that in this case, Soviet crewed lunar program cosmonauts were first.

The movie follows the selection and training of a small group of cosmonauts. The one who shines above the others (similar to the clear front-runners in the early historical Soviet space program) is Captain Ivan Sergeyevich Kharlamov (possibly a reference to the real-life cosmonaut Valentin Varlamov). He is helped into a space suit and loaded into the capsule, and the rocket lifts off for the Moon—but contact with it is soon lost.

Most of the remainder of the film seems to follow the search for information about what happened next, as the 1930s space program appears to have dissolved immediately after, with no reason given (but presumably as a part of Stalin's purges).  It is implied that Kharlamov returned to Earth, but with no fanfare and apparently no assistance from the space program.  A number of men are shown as suspected of being Kharlamov—the NKVD seems to be conducting a criminal investigation of the program and it is implied that those involved, including Kharlamov himself, are in hiding.

It seems that the capsule returned to Earth and landed in Chile, and that Kharlamov journeyed to the Russian Far East by way of Polynesia and China, yet feared capture on his return.  His wife apparently covered for him when interrogated as to his whereabouts.  Kharlamov is later found on the Mongolian steppes following the Battles of Khalkhin Gol, having suffered a severe traumatic brain injury.  After undergoing psychiatric treatment in a sanitorium in Chita, he disappears. His wife later remarries.

The very end of the movie shows the only footage of the mission itself after launch, explaining it as a film which was found at the landing site in Chile and is currently in the possession of the Antofagasta Natural museum.  First there is a brief clip showing Kharlamov piloting the vehicle, presumably on final approach to the Moon.  Following that is an equally brief panorama of a lunar landscape with the capsule or lander (it's unclear whether this was a direct ascent Moon landing) resting on the surface, apparently taken by Kharlamov during lunar EVA.  Both scenes are shown as stills on the movie's cover.  Then there is a short clip of the other cosmonauts walking through a hangar with the 1930s space program director, and the credits roll.

Production
The screenplay was written by Aleksandr Gonorovskiy and Ramil Yamaleyev, and is loosely based on conspiracy theories of lost cosmonauts.

Production of First on the Moon lasted for three years and involved more than a thousand people. Most of filming was performed on Sverdlovsk Film Studio. The cosmonaut space training was filmed in Chelyabinsk, at the Institute of Aviation, where there exists equipment from Star City which even Gagarin used for training. The actors worked without stunt doubles; they were really spinning in the centrifuge, despite the fact that this training is difficult even for professionals.

The film was made in both black and white and color, with cinematography by Anatoliy Lesnikov. Vera Zelinskaya was the production designer.

Cast
Boris Vlasov as Cap. Ivan Kharlamov, the cosmonaut.
Andrei Osipov as Fyodor Suprun, the Chief Constructor.
Viktoriya Ilyinskaya as Nadezhda Svetlaya, a cosmonaut candidate.
Viktor Kotov as Mikhail Roshchin, a cosmonaut candidate with dwarfism.
Aleksei Slavnin as Khanif Fattakhov, a cosmonaut candidate.
Anatoli Otradnov as Khanif Fattakhov in old age.

Reception
When elements of the plot started leaking out, a number of Russian newspapers treated it as a documentary about a real 1938 event, referring to it as the Santiago Meteorite (метеорит "Сантьяго"). In reality, the film is fiction. To quote the director: "Some type of new genre. It was very difficult to decide on a name. So far, for me this is either historical drama or documentary fantasy." He also said: "Our film is about how the Soviet state machinery manufactured major products - the best people. Fine, strong and clever heroes, then rendered [them] unnecessary to the native land – some have been destroyed, others lost in obscurity, yet others still broken by fear."

Julia Vassilieva credits cinematographer Anatoliy Lesnikov and set designer Nikolai Pavlov with a form "... mimicking so successfully the documentary mode" as the reason that First on the Moon won 2005 Venice Film Festival award for a documentary.

Awards

2005 — Cottbus Film Festival of Young East European Cinema: First Work Award of the Student Jury and Special Prize
2005 — Flanders International Film Festival: Grand Prix
2005 — Venice Film Festival: Venice Horizons Documentary Award
2005 — Warsaw International Film Festival: Special Mention
2005 — Zagreb Film Festival:  Golden Pram  Award
2005 — The Best Debut  Prize, Kinotaur festival, Sochi, Russia
2006 — Eurocon: Best performance

See also
Apollo 18 (film)

References

External links 
 

 KinoKultura review by Alexander Prokhorov
 KinoKultura review by Oleg Kovalov
ROUGE review by Julia Vassilieva

2005 films
Russian mystery films
Russian science fiction films
Russian alternate history films
2000s mockumentary films
2005 science fiction films
Moon in film
Films set in Russia
Films set in 1938
Films directed by Aleksey Fedorchenko